The 4-Wheel (Korean 사륜, Japanese 4輪) class locomotives were a class of steam tank locomotives with 0-4-0 wheel arrangement introduced by the Gyeongbu Railway Company in April 1906 for use on the Gyeongui Line.

The Hohenzollern Locomotive Works of Germany in 1899 built a number of 0-4-0 tank locomotives for the Japanese military in 1899. The Gyeongbu Railway Company obtained two of these in April 1906 for use on the Gyeongui Line opened that year. The Chosen Government Railway (Sentetsu) was founded on 1 July 1906 with the acquisition of the Gyeongbu Railway, and used the two locomotives on the Gyeongui Line for shunting and short-haul trains.

They were likely retired prior to 1938, as they were not listed in Sentetsu's general renumbering of that year.

References

Locomotives of Korea
Railway locomotives introduced in 1899
0-4-0T locomotives
Hohenzollern locomotives